Albani Bryggerierne A/S (Eng.: Albani Breweries) is a brewery located in Odense, Denmark, and the vast majority of its customers live on the island of Funen. The brewery was founded by MPharm Theodor Schiøtz in 1859. In 2000, the brewery merged with Bryggerigruppen with the Brewery group (now known as Royal Unibrew), a group of Danish regional breweries.

Albani is most known for two of its beers, Odense Pilsner and Odense Classic.

Beers

Odense Pilsner
Odense Pilsner is a pilsener. The taste is balanced between malt and fruit. Two different varieties of hops are used, both come from Hallertau in Germany. It has been brewed since 1934 and was originally not part of the Albani Brewery's portfolio, but was introduced to the product line with the acquisition of Bryggeriet Odense.

Alcohol by volume: 4.6%

Odense Classic

Odense Classic is a pilsener, though it has a more dark colour than ordinary beers of the same type. The beer has a more rounded, but still powerful taste of malt and hops. It was introduced at the brewery's 140th anniversary in 1999.

Alcohol by volume: 4.6%

Odense Rød Classic
Odense Rød Classic (Danish for Odense Red Classic) is a Vienna lager. A mixture of dark caramel malt and Münchener malt is used. The result is a dark beer with a somewhat rounded taste. The colour is dark golden red, which might be the source of the name.

Alcohol by volume: 4.6%

Giraf Beer
Giraf Beer is a strong pilsener. It was first brewed in 1962, when Odense Zoo's giraffe (Danish: giraf) Kalle was found dead, as the Albani Breweries had previously used this giraffe in its advertisement, it decided to create a special beer, the profits of which would be spent on purchasing a new giraffe for the zoo. The first year's production raised enough funds to buy two giraffes for the zoo.

Red: Alcohol by volume: 7.3%
Black: Alcohol by volume: 10.0%

HC Andersen
HC Andersen is a strong ale-type beer, first brewed in 1988 when the Albani Breweries decided to create a special beer to celebrate Odense's 1,000th anniversary.
The beer became so popular that Albani decided to keep it as a part of its product range. In 1989, it was marketed under its current name, honouring Hans Christian Andersen. A small batch of HC Andersen is brewed every year, and released on Andersen's birthday, April 2. Each year's labels depict a different paper cutting by Hans Christian Andersen. The bottles are also serial numbered. As a result, the beer has become a collector's item. 
The beer is bottom fermented and is matured longer than ordinary beer. The result is a beer with a light taste, considering its high alcohol content.

Alcohol by volume: 9%

Christmas Beers
Albani produces two Christmas beers Blålys (Danish for Blue light) and Rødhætte (Danish for Red Riding Hood). Blålys was introduced in 1960, although it was not Denmark's first Christmas beer, Blålys effectively started the tradition of Danish Christmas beers. Denmark's first Christmas beer was produced by the Carlsminde brewery and had been introduced the previous year. Albani acquired Carlsminde in 1972. Both Blålys and Rødhætte are dark lagers. The label depicts the church-like Gallery Tower of the brewery cover covered in snow. This is the reason why many people originally referred to the Christmas beer as the church beer . This only lasted a few years until other breweries introduced their own Christmas beers.

Blålys: Alcohol by volume: 7%

Rødhætte: Alcohol by volume: 5.6%

Easter beer
Påskebryg (Danish for Easter Brew), is a strong pilsener, and the Albani Breweries' traditional beer for the Easter season. The Påskebryg was introduced in the 1950s and is brewed from a mixture of dark and light malt.

Alcohol by volume: 5,6%

Light beers
Albani also produces two light beers, Odense Light and Odense Extra Light, as light alternatives to its original pilsener. These beers are brewed using light pilsener malt, Münchner malt, and caramel malt.

Odense Light: Alcohol by volume: 2.6%

Odense Extra Light: Alcohol by volume: 0.05%

Mergers and acquisitions
At the turn of the twentieth century there was a large consolidation in the Danish brewing industry, where the larger city breweries typically bought the smaller countryside breweries. Albani was part of this development, buying smaller breweries in Odense and around the island of Funen. Later, when Albani had a near monopoly on beer distribution on Funen, Albani started acquiring breweries in other parts of the country; Sønderborg Bryghus, Bryggeriet Slotsmøllen, Baldur, and Maribo Bryghus, in each case, Albani taking control of the other company. Albani Breweries A/S merged with the Royal Unibrew group in 2000.

Other names used by the group are:

Hans Christian Andersen
Denmark's best known poet and author, Hans Christian Andersen, was very fond of Albani beers. In a letter to a friend he described Albani beer as: Jeg kan ikke rose denne øl højt nok. Den er forfriskende, delikat og stærk. Prøv den! (Danish for I cannot recommend this beer enough. It is refreshing, savoury and strong. Try it!) This quote is occasionally used in the company's marketing.

References

External links
Official site of the Albani Breweries A/S
Official site of Royal Unibrew A/S

Royal Unibrew subsidiaries
1859 establishments in Denmark
Breweries in Denmark
Purveyors to the Court of Denmark
Danish companies established in 1859